Kirkus is an English surname originating from a family living near the kirkus, which referred to a 'kirk (church) house' or the 'parsonage'. The surname first was first found in Yorkshire, but is today most prevalent in the United States. Notable people with this surname include:

 Virginia Kirkus (1893–1980), founder of American book review magazine Kirkus Reviews
 Colin Kirkus (1910–1942), British mountain climber and author
 Sister Gregory Kirkus (1910–2007), English Roman Catholic nun, educator, historian and archivist.

References

Further reading 

 

Surnames